Pérez-Roldán is a surname. Notable people with the surname include:
 Guillermo Pérez-Roldán (born 1969), Argentine tennis player
 Miguel Angel García Pérez-Roldán (born 1981), Spanish footballer

See also
Pérez
Roldán (name)

Compound surnames
Spanish-language surnames